6.9 on the Richter Scale (original title in Romanian: 6,9 pe scara Richter) is a 2016 Romanian musical comedy film directed by Nae Caranfil. It stars Laurențiu Bănescu, Maria Obretin, Teodor Corban and Simona Arsu. The plot revolves around Tony (Bănescu), a theatre actor who moves into a new apartment with his depressed and pathologically jealous wife Kitty (Obretin) and becomes obsessed with the idea that a devastating earthquake will come imminently; he also meets his sexually addicted father (Corban), a former pilot, who Tony hasn't since his childhood.

At the 2018 Gopo Awards, the film was nominated for eight awards, winning five of them.

References

External links 
 

2016 films
2016 comedy films
2010s musical comedy films
Romanian musical comedy films
2010s Romanian-language films
Films directed by Nae Caranfil
Films about musical theatre